Stainton by Langworth is a hamlet and civil parish in the West Lindsey district of Lincolnshire, England.

There is a war memorial in the parish church of St John the Baptist, a Grade II listed building constructed in 1795. An 1885 restoration incorporates earlier 14th-century material, including a font.

References

External links

Stainton War memorial

Hamlets in Lincolnshire
Civil parishes in Lincolnshire
West Lindsey District